This list of cemeteries in Texas includes currently operating, historical (closed for new interments), and defunct (graves abandoned or removed) cemeteries, columbaria, and mausolea which are historical and/or notable. It does not include pet cemeteries.

Bexar County 
 Cathedral of San Fernando, San Antonio; contains tombs
 Fort Sam Houston National Cemetery, San Antonio
 Old San Antonio City Cemeteries Historic District, San Antonio; NRHP-listed
 San Antonio National Cemetery, San Antonio; NRHP-listed

Bowie County 
 Rose Hill Cemetery, Texarkana

Brazoria County 
 Gulf Prairie Cemetery, Jones Creek (formerly Peach Point Plantation Cemetery)

Cass County 
 Whittaker Memorial Cemetery, near Kildare (formerly Whittaker Plantation Cemetery)

Collin County 
 Farmersville Islamic cemetery, Farmersville

Dallas County 

 Dallas–Fort Worth National Cemetery, Dallas
 Greenwood Cemetery, Dallas
 Oakland Cemetery, Dallas
 Pioneer Park Cemetery, Dallas
 Restland Memorial Park, Dallas
 Sparkman-Hillcrest Memorial Park Cemetery, Dallas

El Paso County 
 Concordia Cemetery, El Paso
 Fort Bliss National Cemetery, Fort Bliss, near El Paso

Galveston County 
 Broadway Cemetery Historic District, Galveston; NRHP-listed
 Congregation Beth Jacob Cemetery, Congregation Beth Jacob,  Galveston

Gillespie County 
 Der Stadt Friedhof, Fredericksburg

Harris County 
 Congregation Beth Israel Cemetery, Congregation Beth Israel, Houston
 Founders Memorial Cemetery, Houston
 Glenwood Cemetery, Houston
 Houston National Cemetery, Houston; NRHP-listed
 Olivewood Cemetery, Houston
 Woodlawn Garden of Memories Cemetery, Houston; NRHP-listed

Hidalgo County 
 Jackson Ranch Church Cemetery and Eli Jackson Cemetery, Jackson Ranch Church

Jefferson County 
 Forest Lawn Memorial Park, Beaumont

Kerr County 
 Kerrville National Cemetery, Kerrville

Llano County 
 Baby Head Cemetery, Llano

Lubbock County 
 Eastlawn Memorial Gardens, Lubbock

Marion County 
 Oakwood Cemetery, Jefferson

McLennan County 
 Oakwood Cemetery, Waco

Nueces County 
 Old Bayview Cemetery, Corpus Christi

Tarrant County 
 Greenwood Memorial Park, Fort Worth
 Mount Olivet Cemetery, Fort Worth
 Oakwood Cemetery, Fort Worth
 Pioneers Rest, Fort Worth

Taylor County 
 Elmwood Memorial Park, Abilene

Travis County 
 Capital Memorial Park, Austin
 Moline Swedish Lutheran Cemetery, Elroy
 Oakwood Cemetery, Austin
 San Jose Cemetery, Austin
 Texas State Cemetery, Austin; NRHP-listed

Walker County 
 Captain Joe Byrd Cemetery, Huntsville

Washington County 
 Old Independence Cemetery, Independence

Williamson County 
 IOOF Cemetery, Georgetown
 Old Georgetown Cemetery, Georgetown
 Round Rock Cemetery, Round Rock

See also
 List of cemeteries in the United States
Pioneer cemetery

References

Texas